Interview with a Killa is the fourth album released by rapper, Ganksta NIP. It was released on June 30, 1998 through Rap-a-Lot Records and featured production from Mike Dean, James Prince, J.B., Red Boy and Lakewood. The album peaked at No. 57 on the Top R&B/Hip-Hop Albums chart and No. 34 on the Top Heatseekers chart. This album marked Ganksta NIP's final album with Rap-a-Lot Records. The album sold 19,515 units up to the year 2005

Track listing
"Intro"- 3:25
"Psycho Club"- 3:34
"Move Something"- 2:55
"I Don't Know Why"- 3:14
"Why the Psych. Can't Do It"- 3:54
"Erotic"- 3:47  (Vocals- Tasha)
"Murda Rush"- 2:54
"Video Games"- 3:39
"2 Minutes to Kill"- 2:47
"Psycho on the Loose"- 3:04
"What Makes This Boy Tick"- 4:06 (Vocals - Teresa Keyes)
"Psych Zone"- 3:51
"Psycho Funk"- 3:40
"Sic"- 3:16
"1st Nigga from South Park"- 3:12
"Acid Heads"- 4:25
"Texas Chain Saw"- 3:52
"Outtro"- 3:25

Personnel
Engineer - J.B., Lakewood
Mastered By - Mike Dean
Mixed By - Leroy Williams
Other [Production Coordinator] - Anzel "Red Boy" Jennings
Producer - J.B. (tracks: 4, 5, 7 to 11, 15, 16), Lakewood (tracks: 1 to 3, 6, 12 to 14, 17, 18)
Written By - M. Doucett (tracks: 1 to 3, 6, 12 to 14, 17, 18)
Written-By - J. Blythewood(tracks: 4, 5, 7 to 11, 15, 16), R. Williams

Charts

References

1998 albums
Albums produced by Mike Dean (record producer)
Ganksta N-I-P albums
Rap-A-Lot Records albums
Horrorcore albums